Peacemaker or The Peacemaker (in various forms) may refer to:

Individuals and groups
 UN Peacemaker, a project of the UN to support international peacemakers and mediators
 Peace makers, a list of contemporary individuals and organizations involved in peacemaking
 Peacemakers, an American pacifist organization
 Great Peacemaker, the traditional founder of the Haudenosaunee confederacy
 "The Peacemakers", the title of the 1993 Time Person of the Year, referring to and represented by Yasser Arafat, Yitzhak Rabin, F.W. de Klerk, and Nelson Mandela
 Conservator of the peace

Arts, literature and entertainment

Film and television
 The Peacemaker (1997 film), an action film directed by Mimi Leder, starring George Clooney and Nicole Kidman
 Peacemaker (1990 film), a science fiction film directed by Kevin S. Tenney
 The Peacemaker (1956 film), a Western film directed by Ted Post, starring James Mitchell
 The Peacemaker (1922 film), a British silent drama film
 Peacemakers (TV series), a TV series starring Tom Berenger
 Peacemaker (TV series), a TV series starring John Cena

Literature and printed media
 Peace Maker (pamphlet), an 1842 pamphlet advocating polygamy
 Peacemaker (novel), a 2007 novel by James Swallow
 Peacemaker (C. J. Cherryh novel), a 2014 novel set in C. J. Cherryh's Foreigner universe
 The Peacemaker (newspaper), a pacifist newspaper published in Australia from 1939 to 1971
 The Peacemaker (novel), a 1934 novel by C. S. Forester
 "The Peacemaker" (short story), a 1983 Nebula award-winning short story by Gardner Dozois
 The Peacemaker, a 1618 anti-duelling pamphlet by Thomas Middleton
 Peacemakers (book), a 2001 book by Margaret MacMillan
 Peacemakers Manual, a 2007 book by Egon Ranshofen-Wertheimer

Music
 Roger Clyne and the Peacemakers, a rock music band

Albums
 The Peacemaker (1998), and The Peacemaker 2 (2004), albums by hip hop DJ Tony Touch
 Peace Maker, an album by Eamon McGrath
 Peacemaker (album), a 2012 album by Texas Hippie Coalition

Songs
 "Peacemaker", a Karl L. King song
 "Peacemaker", a song by power metal band Sonata Arctica
 "Peacemaker", a song on Iced Earth's 2014 album Plagues of Babylon
 "Peacemaker", a song from Texas Hippie Coalition's 2012 album Peacemaker (album)
 "Peacemaker", a song on Green Day's 2009 album 21st Century Breakdown
 "The Peacemaker", a 1973 song by Albert Hammond

Other works of art, literature, and entertainment
 Peacemaker (comics), the name of multiple superhero comic book characters from DC Comics
 Peacemaker (Transformers), a character in the Transformers franchise
 PeaceMaker, a 2007 video game designed to promote peace in the Middle East
 Peacemaker Kurogane, a manga and 2003 anime
 The Peacemakers, a famous 1868 painting by George Peter Alexander Healy
 Eidelons, a fictional group referred to as Peacemakers in the Sci Fi Channel series Farscape

Weapons
 Colt Single Action Army, a handgun
 Convair B-36 Peacemaker, a bomber aircraft
 An early name for the LGM-118 Peacekeeper, or MX Missile
 A cannon that exploded aboard the USS Princeton

Other
 Peacemaker (ship), a 1989 Class-A tall ship (barquentine rig)
 Peacemaker, a submarine designed in the 1880s by Josiah Tuck
 SS Empire Peacemaker
 Myrotvorets (Peacemaker), a Ukrainian website which reveals personal information of people who are considered to be "enemies of Ukraine"

See also

 
 
 Peacekeeper (disambiguation)